Liolaemus confusus is a species of lizard in the family  Liolaemidae. It is native to  Chile.

References

confusus
Reptiles described in 2006
Reptiles of Chile
Endemic fauna of Chile